Blowville is an unincorporated community in Clermont County, in the U.S. state of Ohio.

History
A post office called Blowville was established in 1881, and remained in operation until 1905. Besides the post office, Blowville had a country store, which opened in 1872.

References

Unincorporated communities in Clermont County, Ohio
Unincorporated communities in Ohio